The ESPO was a collaborationist, pro-Nazi organization created in the summer of 1941 in German-occupied Greece, under the leadership of Georgios Vlavianos and later Dr. Spyros Sterodimas. Its members were ultra-nationalists, Nazis, and fascists aiming to help the Axis occupation forces against Communism and Jews.

One of their main actions was the ransacking of the synagogue on Melidoni Street, Athens, by the ESPO's youth section.

The bombing 
Dr. Sterodimas, meanwhile, was trying to recruit Greek youth to create a Greek division of the Waffen SS, but was killed together with other 28 members of ESPO (and 48 German soldiers) when the PEAN resistance group blew up the organization's headquarters in central Athens. His death meant the abandonment of these plans, and the effective end of ESPO. During the Day of Atonement services, on September 22, 1942, the Gestapo seized ten prominent Jews in retaliation for this explosion. After the death of Sterodimas, the leadership passed to Aristeides Andronikos, who left to Austria in September 1944 with other collaborators.

Today there is a small monumento to PEAN's leader, Kostas Perrikos at the place.

References 

1941 establishments in Greece
1942 disestablishments in Greece
Political parties established in 1941
Political parties disestablished in 1942
1940s in Greek politics
Defunct nationalist parties in Greece
Fascism in Greece
Greek collaborators with Nazi Germany
Athens in World War II
Nazi parties
Antisemitism in Greece
Anti-communist parties
Far-right political parties in Greece
Greek Orthodoxy in Greece